Punta Gorda Airport  is a public airport three miles east of Punta Gorda, in Charlotte County, Florida. It is owned by the Charlotte County Airport Authority and was formerly called Charlotte County Airport. The airport has mainly been used for general aviation, but has recently seen more scheduled airline service, with flights offered by Allegiant Air to fifty-one destinations.

The airport is home to the Florida International Air Show, an annual event which has featured various military demonstration teams, such as the United States Navy's Flight Demonstration Squadron, the "Blue Angels"; the "U.S. Air Force Thunderbirds"; and the United States Army's "Sky Soldiers" (173rd Airborne Brigade Combat Team) Cobra helicopter team.

History

World War II
In 1941, the U.S. Army Corps of Engineers built an airfield on the current airport property as a combat pilot training base for the U.S. Army Air Forces' (USAAF) Third Air Force, naming the facility Punta Gorda Army Airfield. By 1944, the base reached its peak in housing 1,000 personnel, including two squadrons of student pilots.

The base initially had forty Curtis P-40 Warhawks assigned, later transitioning to the North American P-51 Mustang. Pursuit (i.e., "fighter") aircraft training in the P-40 and P-51 represented advanced phase training for Army Air Forces fighter pilots prior to their being deployed with USAAF operational units in Europe and the Pacific. Punta Gorda Army Airfield was a subordinate command of 3rd Air Force, 3rd Fighter Command at Drew Field (now Tampa International Airport), and also had C-45 Expeditor and C-47 Skytrain transports assigned for support.

The 27th Service Group, an all-black unit, was moved from MacDill Field in Tampa to provide training for support services to the air combat units.

All base officers and some senior non-commissioned officers lived in Punta Gorda, while all student officers and most enlisted men lived in tent structures on the base. Semi-permanent buildings included an operations headquarters, classrooms, supply building, fire station, dispensary, chapel and the control tower. The base had nose dock hangars, where just the nose of the aircraft was under shelter for repairs.

Following the war, the U.S. Government issued a Deed of Release transferring all of the fixtures and improvements situated on the property to Charlotte County.

Airline service
The airport saw no large airlines after the early 1980s in the aftermath of the Airline Deregulation Act of 1978. Airline flights resumed in 2007 when both Skybus Airlines and DayJet began flights at the airport. It didn't last: Skybus ceased operations on April 5, 2008 and DayJet on September 19, 2008.

Airline service resumed on November 22, 2008 when low-cost carrier Direct Air began twice weekly service to 10 cities in the eastern U.S. On December 2, 2008 low-cost airline Allegiant Air also announced it would open a new focus city at PGD and began McDonnell Douglas MD-80 flights to Greenville, South Carolina and Knoxville, Tennessee on March 5, 2009. A third airline, Vision Airlines also commenced weekly flights to Northwest Florida Regional Airport, collocated with Eglin Air Force Base (VPS) in Fort Walton Beach, on March 25, 2011. Vision then offered through ticketing for flights from Punta Gorda to Atlanta, Savannah, and Asheville via connections at the airline's Destin/Fort Walton Beach hub. Vision no longer has a hub at Destin/Fort Walton Beach.

The National Plan of Integrated Airport Systems for 2011–2015 categorized it as a primary commercial service airport since it has over 10,000 passenger boardings (enplanements) per year. Federal Aviation Administration records say the airport had 147,698 enplanements in calendar year 2011, an increase from 87,041 in 2010.

Vision Airlines and Direct Air ended all service to PGD in 2012. Shortly after the collapse of Direct Air, Allegiant grew their PGD presence from three to seven cities and started basing aircraft full-time at the airport. Allegiant continues to grow at PGD; by the end of 2015, Allegiant served 29 destinations from PGD.

Frontier Airlines briefly served PGD in late 2016 to mid 2017 offering flights to Philadelphia, Chicago-O'Hare, and Trenton which had been relocated from nearby Southwest Florida International Airport in Fort Myers. After the tourist season of that year, Frontier discontinued service to PGD and shifted the flights back to Fort Myers.

Florida International Air Show
The airport has been home to the Florida International Air Show since 1981. The Florida International Air Show is a 501(c)(4) nonprofit organization operated wholly by several hundred volunteers that include airport staff. Each year, the Florida International Air Show donates proceeds to various local charities that provide their volunteers for the setup, operations, and breakdown of the event. Through November 2016, the Florida International Air Show has donated $2.9 million to these local working charities throughout its history.

Facilities

Punta Gorda Airport covers 1,934 acres (783 ha) at an elevation of 26 feet (8 m). It has three asphalt runways: 04/22 is 7,193 by 150 feet (2,192 x 46 m), 15/33 is 6,286 by 150 feet (1,916 x 46 m), and 09/27 is 2,636 by 60 feet (803 x 18 m).

In 2007, the airport built a new terminal for the growing number of passengers. It was named the Bailey Terminal for the seven Bailey brothers who were from Punta Gorda, and served in World War II and the Korean War.

The airport has a control tower, which went online in 2012 to accommodate additional commercial passenger service.

In the year ending December 31, 2019 the airport had 81,34 aircraft operations, an average of 222 per day: 84% general aviation, 14% airline, 2% air taxi and less than 1% military. At the time, there were 385 aircraft based at this airport: 314 single-engine, 43 multi-engine, 18 jet, 9 helicopter and 1 glider.

Airlines and destinations

Statistics

Top destinations

Annual traffic

See also

 Florida World War II Army Airfields
 List of airports in Florida

References

External links

 
  brochure from CFASPP
 Aerial image as of December 1998 from USGS The National Map
 
 

Airports in Florida
Transportation buildings and structures in Charlotte County, Florida
Airfields of the United States Army Air Forces in Florida
Airports established in 1943
1943 establishments in Florida
Punta Gorda, Florida